Hans Blumenberg (born 13 July 1920, Lübeck – 28 March 1996, Altenberge) was a German philosopher and intellectual historian.

He studied philosophy, German studies and the classics (1939–47, interrupted by World War II) and is considered to be one of the most important German philosophers of the century. He died on 28 March 1996 in Altenberge (near Münster), Germany.

Blumenberg created what has come to be called 'metaphorology',  which states that what lies under metaphors and language modisms, is the nearest to the truth (and the farthest from ideologies).  His last works, especially "Care Crosses the River" (Die Sorge geht über den Fluss), are attempts to apprehend human reality through its metaphors and involuntary expressions. Digging under apparently meaningless anecdotes of the history of occidental thought and literature, Blumenberg drew a map of  the expressions, examples, gestures, that flourished in the discussions of what are thought to be more important matters.  Blumenberg's interpretations are extremely unpredictable and personal, all full of signs, indications and suggestions, sometimes ironic. Above all, it is a warning against the force of revealed truth, and for the beauty of a world in confusion.

Life 
Hans Blumenberg finished his university entrance exam in 1939 at the Katharineum zu Lübeck, as the only student receiving the grade Auszeichnung ('Distinguished'). But, being labelled a "half-Jew", considering that his mother was Jewish, the Catholic Blumenberg was barred from continuing his studies at any regular institution of learning in Germany. Instead, between 1939 and 1941 he was to pursue his studies of philosophy at the theological universities in Paderborn and Frankfurt, where he was forced to leave towards the end of this period. Back in Lübeck he was enrolled in the workforce at the Drägerwerk AG. In 1944 Blumenberg was detained in a concentration camp, but was released after the intercession of Heinrich Dräger. At the end of the war he was kept hidden by the family of his future wife Ursula. Blumenberg greatly despised the years which he claimed had been stolen from him by the Nazis. His friend Odo Marquard reports that after the war, Blumenberg slept only six times a week in order to make up for lost time. Consequently, the theme of finite life and limited time as a hurdle for scholasticism recurs frequently in Part 2 of The Legitimacy of the Modern Age. After 1945 Blumenberg continued his studies of philosophy, Germanistics and classical philology at the University of Hamburg, and graduated in 1947 with a dissertation on the origin of the ontology of the Middle Ages, at the University of Kiel. He received the postdoctoral habilitation in 1950, with a dissertation on Ontological Distance, an Inquiry into the Crisis of Edmund Husserl's Phenomenology (Die ontologische Distanz: Eine Untersuchung über die Krisis der Phänomenologie Husserls). His mentor during these years was Ludwig Landgrebe. During Blumenberg's lifetime he was a member of the Senate of the German Research Foundation, a professor at several universities in Germany and a joint founder of the research group "Poetics and Hermeneutics".

Work 

Blumenberg's work was of a predominantly historical nature, characterized by his great philosophical and theological learning, and by the precision and pointedness of his writing style. The early text "Paradigms for a Metaphorology" explicates the idea of 'absolute metaphors', by way of examples from the history of ideas and philosophy. According to Blumenberg, metaphors of this kind, such as "the naked truth", are to be considered a fundamental aspect of philosophical discourse that cannot be replaced by concepts and reappropriated into the logicity of the 'actual'. The distinctness and meaning of these metaphors constitute the perception of reality as a whole, a necessary prerequisite for human orientation, thought and action. The founding idea of this first text was further developed in works on the metaphors of light in theories of knowledge, of being in navigation (Shipwreck with Spectator, 1979) and the metaphors of books and reading. (The Legibility of the World, 1979)

In Blumenberg's many inquiries into the history of philosophy the threshold of the late Middle Ages and the early Renaissance provides a focal point (Legitimacy of the Modern Age and The Genesis of the Copernican World). Inspired by (amongst others) Ernst Cassirer's functional perspective on the history of ideas and philosophy, and the concomitant view of a rearrangement within the spiritual relationships specific to an epoch, Blumenberg rejects the substantialism of historical continuity — fundamental to the so-called 'theorem of secularization'; the Modern age in his view represents an independent epoch opposed to Antiquity and the Middle Ages by a rehabilitation of human curiosity in reaction to theological absolutism. "Hans Blumenberg targets Karl Löwith's argument that progress is the secularization of Hebrew and Christian beliefs and argues to the contrary that the modern age, including its belief in progress, grew out of a new secular self-affirmation of culture against the Christian tradition." Wolfhart Pannenberg, a student of Löwith, has continued the debate against Blumenberg.

In his later works (Work on Myth, Out of the Cave) Blumenberg, guided by Arnold Gehlen's  view of man as a frail and finite being in need of certain auxiliary ideas in order to face the "Absolutism of Reality" and its overwhelming power, increasingly underlined the anthropological background of his ideas: he treated myth and metaphor as a functional equivalent to the distancing, orientational and relieving value of institutions as understood by Gehlen. This context is of decisive importance for Blumenberg's idea of absolute metaphors. Whereas metaphors originally were a means of illustrating the reality of an issue, giving form to understanding, they were later to tend towards a separate existence, in the sciences as elsewhere. This phenomenon may range from the attempt to fully explicate the metaphor while losing sight of its illustrative function, to the experience of becoming immersed in metaphors influencing the seeming logicality of conclusions. The idea of 'absolute metaphors' turns out to be of decisive importance for the ideas of a culture, such as the metaphor of light as truth in Neo-Platonism, to be found in the hermeneutics of Martin Heidegger and Hans-Georg Gadamer. The critical history of concepts may thus serve the depotentiation of metaphorical power. Blumenberg did, however, also warn his readers not to confound the critical deconstruction of myth with the programmatical belief in the overcoming of any mythology. Reflecting his studies of Husserl, Blumenberg's work concludes that in the last resort our potential scientific enlightenment finds its own subjective and anthropological limit in the fact that we are constantly falling back upon the imagery of our contemplations.

Works
Hans Blumenberg is the author of:
(1947) Contributions to the problem of the originality of the medieval-scholastic ontology (doctoral thesis, unpublished).
(1950) The ontological distance. An investigation into the crisis of Husserl's phenomenology (habilitation thesis, unpublished).
(1966) The Legitimacy of the Modern Age
(1975) The Genesis of the Copernican World
(1979) The Legibility of the World
(1979) Work on Myth
(1986) Lifetime and world time
(1987) Care Crosses the River
(1993) St Matthew Passion

Works in English translation
 The Readability of the World. Trans. Robert Savage and David Roberts. Ithaca, Cornell University Press, 2022. .
 St. Matthew Passion. Trans. Helmut Müller-Sievers and Paul Fleming. Ithaca, Cornell University Press, 2021. .
 History, Metaphors, Fables: A Hans Blumenberg Reader. Ed. and trans. Hannes Bajohr, Florian Fuchs, and Joe Paul Kroll. Ithaca, Cornell University Press, 2020. .
 Lions. Trans. Kári Driscoll. London, Seagull Books, 2018. 
 Rigorism of Truth: "Moses the Egyptian" and Other Writings on Freud and Arendt. Trans. Joe Paul Kroll. Ithaca, Cornell University Press, 2018. 
 The Laughter of the Thracian Woman: A Protohistory of Theory. Trans. Spencer Hawkins. New York, Bloomsbury Academic, 2015. 
 Care Crosses the River. Trans. Paul Fleming. Stanford, Stanford University Press, 2010. 
 Paradigms for a Metaphorology. Trans. Robert Savage. Ithaca, Cornell University Press, 2010. 
 "Does It Matter When? On Time Indifference", Philosophy and Literature 22 (1): 212-218 (1998). Trans. David Adams.
 Shipwreck with Spectator: Paradigm of a Metaphor for Existence. Trans. Steven Rendall. Cambridge, MIT Press, 1996. 
 "Light as a Metaphor for Truth: At the Preliminary Stage of Philosophical Concept Formation", in Modernity and the Hegemony of Vision, ed. David Michael Levin, University of California, Berkeley, 1993, pp. 30–86. Trans. Joel Anderson.
 "Being – A MaGuffin: How to Preserve the Desire to Think", Salmagundi No. 90/91 (Spring-Summer 1991), pp. 191–193. Trans. David Adams.
 "An Anthropological Approach to the Contemporary Significance of Rhetoric", in After Philosophy: End or Transformation?, eds. Kenneth Baynes, James Bohman, and Thomas McCarthy, MIT Press, Cambridge, 1987, pp. 423–458. Trans. Robert M. Wallace.
 The Genesis of the Copernican World. Trans. Robert M. Wallace. Cambridge, MIT Press, 1987. 
 The Legitimacy of the Modern Age. Trans. Robert M. Wallace. Cambridge, MIT Press, 1985. 
 Work on Myth. Trans. Robert M. Wallace. Cambridge, MIT Press, 1985. 
 "To Bring Myth to an End", New German Critique 32 (1984), 109-140. Trans. Robert M. Wallace. [Chapter from Work on Myth.]
 "Self-Preservation and Inertia: On the Constitution of Modern Rationality", Contemporary German Philosophy 3 (1983), 209-256.
 "The Concept of Reality and the Possibility of the Novel", in New Perspectives in German Literary Criticism: A Collection of Essays, ed. Richard E. Amacher and Victor Lange, Princeton, Princeton University Press, 1979, pp. 29–48. Trans. David Henry Wilson. 
 "On a Lineage of the Idea of Progress", Social Research 41 No. 1 (1974): 5-27. Trans. E.B. Ashton.
 "The Life-World and the Concept of Reality", in Life-World and Consciousness: Essays for Aron Gurwitsch, ed. Lester E. Embree, Evanston, Northwestern University, 1972

References

Secondary literature

Bibliography
 Bajohr, Hannes: "Bibliography," in Hans Blumenberg: History, Metaphors, Fables: A Hans Blumenberg Reader. Ed. and trans. Hannes Bajohr, Florian Fuchs, and Joe Paul Kroll. Ithaca, Cornell University Press, 2020, 583–592. 
 Adams, David; Behrenberg, Peter: "Bibliographie Hans Blumenberg", in Franz Josef Wetz and Hermann Timm (Eds.): Die Kunst des Überlebens: Nachdenken über Hans Blumenberg. Frankfurt am Main: Suhrkamp, 1999.

English
 Adams, David: "Metaphors for Mankind: The Development of Hans Blumenberg's Anthropological Metaphorology," Journal of the History of Ideas 52 (1991), 152–166.
 Brient, Elizabeth: The Immanence of the Infinite: Hans Blumenberg and the Threshold to Modernity. Washington, D.C.: Catholic University of America Press, 2002.
 Fragio, Alberto: Paradigms for a Metaphorology of the Cosmos. Hans Blumenberg and the Contemporary Metaphors of the Universe. Roma: Aracne Editrice, 2015.
 Isenberg, Bo: "Answering the Question: What is Culture? A Sociological Reworking of the Philosophy of Hans Blumenberg", in Yamamoto, Tetsuji & Paul Rabinow & Roger Chartier (eds), Philosophical Designs for a Socio-Cultural Transformation. Beyond Violence and the Modern Era. Tokyo: Rowman & Littlefield, 1998.
 Jay, Martin: "The Legitimacy of the Modern Age" (review), History and Theory 24:2 (1985), 183-196.
 Keum, Tae-Yeoun: "Hans Blumenberg and the Concept of Myth in Germany," Journal of the History of Ideas Blog (2019)
 Knatz, Jonas: Interview with Rüdiger Zill about Hans Blumenberg’s life, his philosophical oeuvre, and his anglophone reception on the Journal of the History of Ideas Blog (2020).
 Krajewski, Bruce: "The Musical Horizon of Religion: Hans Blumenberg's Matthäuspassion," History of the Human Sciences 6.4 (1993): 81-95.
 Nicholls, Angus: Myth and the Human Sciences: Hans Blumenberg's Theory of Myth. New York: Routledge, 2014.
 Rasmussen, Ulrik Houlind: "The Memory of God. Hans Blumenberg's Philosophy of Religion", København 2009
 Shariti, Mohamed: Interview with Bruce Krajewski about Blumenberg's Work on Myth in Tehran-based journal Today's Culture (2017). 
 Wallace, Robert M.: “Progress, Secularization and Modernity: The Löwith-Blumenberg Debate," New German Critique, No. 22 (1981), 63-79.
 Special issues of History of the Human Sciences (6:4, 1993) and Annals of Scholarship (5:1, 1987)

German
 Behrenberg, Peter: Endliche Unsterblichkeit. Studien zur Theologiekritik Hans Blumenbergs. Würzburg: Königshausen & Neumann, 1994. 
 Goldstein, Jürgen: Nominalismus und Moderne: zur Konstitution neuzeitlicher Subjektivität bei Hans Blumenberg und Wilhelm von Ockham. Freiburg (Breisgau); München: Alber, 1998.   
 Haefliger, Jürg: Imaginationssysteme: erkenntnistheoretische, anthropologische und mentalitätshistorische Aspekte der Metaphorologie Hans Blumenbergs. Bern; Berlin; Frankfurt/M.; New York; Paris; Wien: Lang, 1996.  
 Heidenreich, Felix: Mensch und Moderne bei Hans Blumenberg. München 2005.
 Hundeck, Markus: Welt und Zeit: Hans Blumenbergs Philosophie zwischen Schöpfungs- und Erlösungslehre. Würzburg: Echter, 2000.  
 Müller, Oliver: Sorge um die Vernunft. Hans Blumenbergs phänomenologische Anthropologie. Paderborn: Mentis Verlag, 2005
 Stoellger, Philipp: Metapher und Lebenswelt : Hans Blumenbergs Metaphorologie als Lebenswelthermeneutik und ihr religionsphänomenologischer Horizont. Tübingen: Mohr Siebeck, 2000.  
 Wetz, Franz Josef: Hans Blumenberg zur Einführung. Hamburg: Junius-Verl., 2004, 2nd Ed.,  
 Wetz, Franz Josef and Hermann Timm (Hrsg.): Die Kunst des Überlebens : Nachdenken über Hans Blumenberg. Frankfurt am Main: Suhrkamp, 1999. 
 Zambon, Nicola: Das Nachleuchten der Sterne. Konstellationen der Moderne bei Hans Blumenberg, Paderborn: Fink, 2017, .

Italian
 Borsari, Andrea: Hans Blumenberg. Mito, metafora, modernità, Bologna: Il Mulino, 1999.

Spanish
 G. Cantón, César, La metaforología en Blumenberg, como destino de la analítica existencial, Servicio de Publicaciones de la UCM, 2004.
 G. Cantón, César, Blumenberg versus Heidegger: la metaforología como destino de la analítica existencial, Anuario Filosófico XXXVIII (2005) 83, 725-746.
 G. Cantón, César, “La metaforología como laboratorio antropológico” (pags. 9–25), estudio introductorio a: Hans Blumenberg, Conceptos en historias, Síntesis 2003, 303 pags..
 Fragio, Alberto, Destrucción, cosmos, metáfora. Ensayos sobre Hans Blumenberg, Lampi di stampa, Milano 2013.

External links
 Obituary - New York Times, April 15, 1996
 Portrait, profile and publications with Suhrkamp Verlag, Blumenberg's publisher
 "Hans Blumenberg and His Myth Science Arkestra", by David Auerbach - Ready Steady Book, July 8, 2011
 "The Afterlife of Hans Blumenberg's Centennial", by Bruce J. Krajewski - Journal of the History of Ideas Blog, September 14, 2020

1920 births
1996 deaths
German people of Jewish descent
Writers from Lübeck
Academic staff of the University of Münster
German male writers
20th-century German philosophers